Senator Hagedorn may refer to:

Bob Hagedorn (born 1952), Colorado State Senate
Garrett W. Hagedorn (1910–1985), New Jersey State Senate